Yanchang Road is a station on Shanghai Metro Line 1. It is located in Jing'an District along Gonghexin Road (which is underneath the North–South Elevated Road), and is the first station outside the Inner Ring Road when travelling northbound from the central Huangpu District.

Places nearby
Shanghai University, Yanchang Campus
Zhabei Park

References

Shanghai Metro stations in Jing'an District
Railway stations in China opened in 2004
Line 1, Shanghai Metro
Railway stations in Shanghai